The Pitts Specials Formation Aerobatic Team is a civilian airshow team flying Pitts Special S-2B biplanes throughout the United States, Central America and Canada.

External links
 Team Home Page

Aviation in Canada
Aerobatic teams